Bromsten is a middle-class district of northwestern Stockholm and belongs to the Spånga-Tensta borough. The ruins of an ancient hill fort located in the area are believed to be the source of the district's name.

References

External links 
 Bromsten - homepage

Districts of Stockholm

Districts in Västerort